The Curitiba Challenger is a professional tennis tournament played on clay courts. It is currently part of the ATP Challenger Tour. It is held annually in Curitiba, Brazil, since 2016.

Past finals

Singles

Doubles

External links 
Official website
ITF Search

ATP Challenger Tour
Clay court tennis tournaments
Tennis tournaments in Brazil